Joseph Fay may refer to:
 Joseph Fay (artist), German painter and illustrator
 Joseph Fay (politician), American politician, militia officer, and businessman in Vermont

See also
 Joseph S. Fay Shipwreck Site